The Lufuko River (or Lufuku) is a river in the Democratic Republic of the Congo that empties into Lake Tanganyika beside the village of Mpala in Tanganyika Province (formerly Katanga Province).

Geography

The Lufuko drains part of the Marungu highlands. There have been proposals to conserve the forests above  that border the Mulobozi River and Lufuko River into nature preserve areas. 

Theo Kassner travelled through the region in 1909. He reached the Tanganyika watershed at Mount Giambe. He recorded:

Fish
A species of catfish locally called ndjagali use the river for spawning from September to November.  The fish are considered a delicacy by the people of the region. In the past they were owned and caught communally, and traded with other communities for salt or iron.   The people considered that the spirit of the earth, Kaomba, caused them to multiply.

The catfish were a major source of food for the villagers, but over-fishing around the end of the nineteenth century significantly reduced the numbers.  In the mid-1970s the local villagers still caught the fish in weirs until the rainy season began, 
when the weirs were destroyed and the fish could pass to breeding areas higher up the river.

Captain Émile Storms established a station named "Mpala" at the mouth of the Lufuko River in May 1883.  The station was established at the village of Lubanda, and was named after the local chief.

When missionaries took over the post in 1885 they recognized the beliefs about Kaomba and identified the sacred parts of the river.  For many years they controlled access to the river, using it for their own food or to reward those loyal to them. 

With technological advances at the start of the twentieth century it became possible to fish the lake far from the shores, and fishing became an individual occupation.

References
Citations

Sources

Rivers of the Democratic Republic of the Congo
Tanganyika Province
Tributaries of Lake Tanganyika